The Eastern Hockey League (EHL) is an American Tier III Junior ice hockey league with teams in the Northeastern and Mid-Atlantic United States. The EHL was officially announced on June 6, 2013, after the Atlantic Junior Hockey League welcomed six new members from the old Eastern Junior Hockey League and the AJHL re-branded itself under the EHL banner

The league prepares high school and college aged players for college and professional hockey. The league has hundreds of alumni that have gone on to play for NCAA colleges, various professional leagues, the CHL, and in Europe.

History
The Atlantic Junior Hockey League (AJHL or AtJHL) was part of the Atlantic Metropolitan Hockey League organization and was formed in 2003 with a stated goal to "meet the needs of the junior hockey community and the players it serves in the Eastern United States". The AJHL played its first season in 2003–04 with six teams that had previously played in the Junior B Metropolitan Junior Hockey League. On May 30, 2012 the AJHL announced that after nine years of being a part of the Atlantic Metropolitan Hockey League, the 12 AJHL ownership groups successfully became a stand-alone entity. After the split, the AJHL was managed and governed solely by the league owners.

In 2013, Tier III junior hockey leagues underwent a large reorganization that led to the dissolution of the Eastern Junior Hockey League and six of their former members joining the AJHL. Prior to the 2013–14 season, the AJHL re-branded to become the Eastern Hockey League (EHL). The six members who came from the EJHL were the Boston Bandits, Connecticut Oilers, New Hampshire Jr. Monarchs, New York Apple Core, Philadelphia Revolution, and the Valley Jr. Warriors.

In December 2014, the EHL announced the Connecticut Nighthawks as an expansion franchise to start in the 2015–16. They also announced the formation of the EHL-Elite Division and that eight teams would participate in the first season composed of the former Junior B teams for EHL organizations. The formation of the Elite Division led to the previous Junior A members to be placed in the EHL-Premier Division. In May 2015, the North American Hockey League, a Tier II league, announced that the New Jersey Junior Titans and the Wilkes-Barre/Scranton Knights had been approved to elevate their organizations. After their promotion, the two EHL franchises went dormant.

In March 2016, the EHL announced that it was changing the name of the Elite Division to 19U Elite Division for the 2016–17 season and doubling in size by adding eight more teams, mostly the prospect teams from the Premier Division's South Conference teams. However, the 19U Elite Connecticut Nighthawks team were dropped from the schedule prior to their first season.

In December 2016, it was announced that six organizations (the Boston Bandits, Connecticut Nighthawks, Hartford Jr. Wolfpack, New Hampshire Jr. Monarchs, New Jersey Rockets, and the Northern Cyclones) would be leaving the EHL for the 2017–18 season for the United States Premier Hockey League (USPHL). The Bandits, Rockets, and Cyclones had already been announced as adding free-to-play teams in the USPHL's National Collegiate Development Conference (NCDC) for the 2017–18 season. All six organizations will add their Premier and Elite teams to the USPHL's Premier and Elite Divisions.

In February 2017, the EHL announced that they would expand to make up for the teams lost to the NCDC. The first team announced was New Hampshire Avalanche, an organization that previously only had youth teams. Next, it was announced the league would be adding the teams from the North American 3 Atlantic Hockey League (the former Metropolitan Junior Hockey League). The six teams from the NA3AHL were the Central Penn Panthers, Jersey Wildcats, Long Island Royals, Metro Fighting Moose (who left for the USHPL after the announcement), New Jersey Renegades, and the return of the Wilkes-Barre/Scranton Knights. The league also listed the New Jersey 87's and Cape Cod-based Total Athletics. The one-year dormant New York Bobcats also returned as the Bobcats Royals as part of an organizational merger with the Long Island Jr. Royals of the NA3AHL. The Connecticut Oilers relocated from Norwalk to Hamden following the announcement that the ownership of the USHL's Cedar Rapids RoughRiders added a team called the Connecticut RoughRiders that will play out of the Oilers' former arena in Norwalk.

In March 2017, the EHL announced their new divisional structure for the 2017–18 season with 16 teams in the Premier and 17 in the Elite, although the Elite would decrease to 13 after the departures of the Connecticut Oilers Elite team, the Lehigh Valley Jr. Rebels, Long Island Royals, and Metro Moose. In May 2017, the league announced that they would reorganize their two-tier league with the top tier (formerly called the Premier) being only called the Eastern Hockey League and the lower tier being called the Eastern Hockey League Premier Division. The naming conventions were changed to put the emphasis on the top-level league for college development.

Teams

EHL teams
As of October 24, 2021:

EHLP teams
As of October 24, 2021:

Former teams
Binghamton Jr. Senators — AJHL, 2006–2010. Relocated and became Wilkes-Barre/Scranton Knights.
Boston Bandits — EHL, 2013–2017. Joined the USPHL and its National Collegiate Development Conference.
Boston Bulldogs — AJHL, 2004–2012. Relocated and became Boston Junior Rangers.
Brewster Bulldogs – 19U Elite, 2016–17. Joined from the Metropolitan Junior Hockey League. Junior organization merged with the New York Apple Core.
Central Penn Panthers – EHLP, 2017–2019. Joined from the North American 3 Atlantic Hockey League. 
Connecticut Nighthawks — EHL, 2015–2017. Joined the USPHL and its National Collegiate Development Conference.
Connecticut Oilers — EHL 2013–2017. Franchise purchased and relocated to Newington and re-branded Connecticut Chiefs.
Hartford Jr. Wolfpack — Charter member of the AJHL/EHL, 2003–2017. Joined the USPHL Premier Division.
Hudson Valley Eagles — AJHL, 2005–2007.
Jersey Wildcats — EHL Premier, 2017–18. Joined from the NA3AHL in 2017, not listed in 2018.
Lehigh Valley Jr. Rebels — 19U Elite Division, 2016–17. Returned with an EHL team in 2018–19, but were removed by the league early into the season due to using an ineligible player.
Maine Eclipse — EHL/EHLP, 2020–2021. Initially announced as the Keene Eclipse, based out of Keene, New Hampshire, in the EHL and EHL Premier for the 2020–21 season, but relocated before the season to Biddeford, Maine. The Eclipse then withdrew about halfway through the season. Returned for the 2021–22 season, but were removed from the schedule after four games played by the EHL team and three by the EHLP team.
Laconia Leafs — AJHL, 2005–2013. Renamed New Hampshire Lakers but went dormant for 2013–14 season. Relocated to Waterville Valley, New Hampshire, in 2014 and returned as the New England Wolves.
New Hampshire Junior Monarchs — EHL, 2013–2017. Joined the USPHL Premier Division.
New Jersey Junior Titans — Charter member of AJHL, 2003–04. AJHL team dormant from 2004 to 2012. Returned from 2012 to 2015. EHL team went dormant again in 2015 after organization joined the NAHL.
New Jersey Rockets — AJHL/EHL, 2004–2017. Joined the USPHL and its National Collegiate Development Conference.
New York Bobcats — Charter member of AJHL, 2003–2016. Was not listed for the 2016–17 season but returned in 2017 as the New York Bobcats Royals as part of their merge with the Long Island Jr. Royals. Not listed again for 2018–19.
New York Bridgemen — EHLP, 2019–20. Not listed as a member of the EHL Premier in the 2020–21 season.
North Carolina Golden Bears — EHL, 2018–2020. Golden Bears were not listed as a member for the 2020–21 season.
North Jersey Avalanche — Charter member of AJHL, 2003–04. Returned to only fielding a team in the Metropolitan Junior Hockey League in 2004.
Northern Cyclones — AJHL/EHL, 2004–2017. Joined the USPHL and its National Collegiate Development Conference.
Philadelphia Junior Flyers — AJHL/EHL, 2008–2020. Junior Flyers were not listed as fielding a junior team in the EHL in 2020–21.
Philadelphia Revolution — EHL/EHLP, 2013–2020. Joined from the Eastern Junior Hockey League (EJHL) in 2013; were not listed as fielding a junior team in the EHL or the EPHL in 2020–21.
Portland Jr. Pirates — AJHL, 2004–2012. Jr. Pirates organization purchased an Eastern Junior Hockey League franchise and joined the EJHL.
Washington Jr. Nationals — Charter member of AJHL, 2003–2014. Relocated and became Vermont Lumberjacks.
Wilkes-Barre/Scranton Knights — AJHL/EHL, 2010–2015. EHL team went dormant in 2015 after organization joined the NAHL. Returned in 2017 before leaving again for the North American 3 Hockey League in 2019.

Championships

EHL  (formerly AJHL/EHL-Premier)

EHLP (formerly -19U Elite)

See also
List of ice hockey leagues

References

External links
 EHL Official Website
 EHL-Premier Official Website

3